Semagystia monticola is a moth in the family Cossidae. It was described by Grigory Grum-Grshimailo in 1890. It is found in Uzbekistan, Afghanistan, Kirghizistan and Tajikistan.

References

Cossinae
Moths described in 1890